Gillellus ornatus, the Ornate stargazer, is a species of sand stargazer native to the Gulf of California.  It can reach a maximum length of  NG.

References

ornatus
Fish described in 1892